This article is about the particular significance of the year 1938 to Wales and its people.

Incumbents

Archbishop of Wales – Charles Green, Bishop of Bangor
Archdruid of the National Eisteddfod of Wales – J.J.

Events
14–19 January – A storm causes extensive damage in Aberystwyth; the promenade and pier are largely destroyed by 90 mph winds.
8 May – William Ormsby-Gore succeeds his father as Baron Harlech.
October – The first scheduled night flight in the UK begins operating between Cardiff and Weston-super-Mare.
23 November – Opening of the Temple of Peace and Health in Cathays Park, Cardiff.
Mining comes to an end at Dolaucothi Gold Mines.
The excavation of Llantwit Major Roman Villa by V. E. Nash-Williams, begins (continues to 1948).
Opening of RNAD Trecwm.

Arts and literature
April – Augustus John resigns from the Royal Academy.
September – Ivor Novello appears in Henry V at Drury Lane Theatre, produced by Lewis Casson.

Awards
National Eisteddfod of Wales (held in Cardiff)
National Eisteddfod of Wales: Chair – Gwilym R. Jones
National Eisteddfod of Wales: Crown – Edgar H. Thomas
National Eisteddfod of Wales: Prose Medal – Elena Puw Morgan

New books

In English
Idris Davies – Gwalia Deserta
Ness Edwards – History of the South Wales Miners Federation
Richard Hughes – In Hazard
Jack Jones – Bidden to the Feast
Edith Picton-Turbervill – Myself When Young
William Plomer (ed.) – Kilvert's Diary, 1870-1879

In Welsh
Richard Bennett – Methodistiaeth Caersws
Tom Beynon – Gwrid ar Orwel ym Morgannwg
Edward Tegla Davies – Stori Sam
Edward Morgan Humphreys – Dirgelwch Gallt Y Ffrwd
Ifor Williams (ed.) – Canu Aneirin

New drama
James Kitchener Davies – Susannah
Charles Langbridge Morgan – The Flashing Stream
Emlyn Williams – The Corn is Green

Music
Tudor Davies plays the lead in the first English-language production of Verdi's Don Carlos, at Sadler's Wells.

Film
Naunton Wayne appears as Caldicott in The Lady Vanishes.

Broadcasting
1 March – BBC Radio broadcasts the world première of Arwel Hughes's latest composition, Tydi a Roddaist.

Sport
Empire Games
 Wales win three medals at the 1938 Empire Games, Denis Reardon, (middleweight boxing), Jim Alford (1 mile run) and Jeanne Greenland (110 yard backstroke).
Rugby union
5 February – Scotland beat Wales 8–6 at Murrayfield, Edinburgh

Births
6 January – William Edwards, politician (d. 2007)
1 February - Cynog Dafis, politician
22 January – Brook Williams, actor (d. 2005)
20 April – Andrew Vicari, portrait painter (d. 2016)
25 April – John Davies, historian (d. 2015)
14 May – Clive Rowlands, rugby player and coach
25 May – Trevor Peck, footballer (d. 2014)
31 May – John Prescott, Deputy Prime Minister of the UK
13 June – Gwynne Howell, bass
6 July – Tony Lewis, cricketer and commentator
23 July – Meic Stephens, literary editor (d. 2018)
6 August – Rees Davies, historian (d. 2005)
12 September
Richard Booth, secondhand bookseller (d. 2019)
Patrick Mower, Welsh-descended actor
9 October – Denzil Davies, politician (d. 2018)
1 November – Delwyn Williams, politician
4 December – Richard Meade, equestrian (d. 2015)
15 December – Michael Bogdanov, theatre director (d. 2017 in Greece)

Deaths
3 February – James Bevan, First Wales rugby union captain, 81
9 February – Dick Hellings, Wales international rugby player, 63
30 March – Jack Elliott, Wales international rugby player, 66
16 April – Sir William Price, industrialist
8 May – George Ormsby-Gore, 3rd Baron Harlech, 83
28 May – Alfred Brice, Wales international rugby player, 66
23 June – Clement Edwards, politician, 69
22 July – Giotto Griffiths, Wales international rugby player, 73
22 October (in Dublin) – Sir John Purser Griffith, civil engineer, 90
4 November – John Thomas Job, minister, hymn-writer and poet, 71
28 November – Reginald Arthur (Reggie) Gibbs, shipowner and rugby footballer, 56
29 December (at sea) – Eluned Morgan, writer, 68
date unknown – Gwynfil Evans (Barry Western), novelist

See also
1938 in Northern Ireland

References

 
Wales